"Daniel" is a song written by English musician Elton John and songwriter Bernie Taupin, and performed by John. It was first released on John's 1973 album Don't Shoot Me I'm Only the Piano Player.

In the United Kingdom, the song reached No. 4 in the official chart. In the United States, the song reached No. 2 on the pop charts (only held from number one by "My Love" by Paul McCartney and Wings) and No. 1 on the adult contemporary charts for two weeks in the spring of 1973.

In the US, it was certified gold in September 1995 and platinum in May 2018 by the RIAA. In Canada, it became his second No. 1 single, following "Crocodile Rock" earlier in the year, holding the position for two weeks in the RPM 100 national singles chart. John and Taupin received the 1973 Ivor Novello award for Best Song Musically and Lyrically. The song appeared on the soundtrack of the 1974 film Alice Doesn't Live Here Anymore.

Composition 
Bernie Taupin wrote the lyrics after reading an article in either Time or Newsweek about a Vietnam War veteran who had been wounded, and wanted to get away from the attention he was receiving when he came back home. The last verse in the original draft was cut from the final version, which has led to some speculation on the contents.

Reception
Cash Box said that the "fascinating lyrics by Bernie Taupin will make you want to listen over and over again."

Personnel 
 Elton John – Vocals, back-up vocals, Fender Rhodes electric piano, Mellotron (for flute parts)
 Davey Johnstone – acoustic guitar, banjo
 Dee Murray – bass
 Nigel Olsson – drums, maracas
 Ken Scott – ARP synthesizer

Chart performance

Weekly charts

Year-end charts

Certifications

Accolades 
Grammy Awards

|-
|1974
|"Daniel"
|Best Pop Vocal Performance – Male
|

Notable covers 
"Daniel" was covered on the 1991 album Two Rooms: Celebrating the Songs of Elton John & Bernie Taupin by Wilson Phillips. It reached number seven on the US and Canadian Adult Contemporary charts as an album cut. The song also reached number 26 on the Canadian pop chart.

Sam Smith covered the song for the 2018 tribute album Revamp: Reimagining the Songs of Elton John & Bernie Taupin.

Marie Laforêt adapted and covered the song in French (title: "Daniel") in 1974. It was released as the B-side of the "Cadeau" EP. 125,000 copies were sold in France.

See also 
List of RPM number-one singles of 1973 (Canada)
List of number-one adult contemporary singles of 1973 (U.S.)

References

External links 
 
 

Songs about soldiers
1973 songs
1973 singles
1970s ballads
Elton John songs
Wilson Phillips songs
Songs with music by Elton John
Songs with lyrics by Bernie Taupin
RPM Top Singles number-one singles
Song recordings produced by Gus Dudgeon
Rock ballads
DJM Records singles
MCA Records singles